South Carolina Highway 908 (SC 908) is a  state highway in the U.S. state of South Carolina. The highway connects rural areas of Marion County with Brittons Neck.

Route description
SC 908 begins at a skewed intersection with U.S. Route 378 (US 378) northeast of Johnsonville, Marion County, where the roadway continues south as a dirt road to the Woodbury Wildlife Management Area. It travels to the north-northwest and curves to a nearly due north direction. Just before it travels through Brittons Neck, it curves to the north-northwest and crosses Alligator Run. In the community, it passes a U.S. Post Office. Just after crossing Marsh Creek, it meets its northern terminus, an intersection with SC 41 at a point south of Centenary.

Major intersections

See also

References

External links

SC 908 at Virginia Highways' South Carolina Highways Annex

908
Transportation in Marion County, South Carolina